The Coils of Apollyon is the third studio album by the Indian heavy metal band Kryptos. The album was released in India on February 18, 2012 through Bangalore-based record label, Iron Fist Records. Internationally, the album was released on September 21, 2012 through AFM Records.

The album artwork was designed by renowned graphic artist Mark Riddick.

Track listing

Personnel
 Nolan Lewis – Guitar, Vocals
 Rohit Chaturvedi – Guitar
 Jayawant Tewari – Bass
 Ryan Colaco – Drums
Additional Personnel
Mark Riddick – Artwork
Anupam Roy – Mastering

References

2012 albums
Kryptos (band) albums